Speed n' Spikes Volume 1 is a split EP by thrash metal bands Blüdwülf and Toxic Holocaust released under Relapse Records.

Track listing

Personnel
Toxic Holocaust
 Joel Grind  — vocals, guitar, bass, drums

Blüdwülf
Donnie of the Dead - drums
Dave of The Dead - guitars
Lord Reverand Jimmi Sinn - vocals
America Nightmare - bass

Additional
Mick Mullin - mastering

References

2008 EPs
Toxic Holocaust albums
Relapse Records EPs